The Robert E. Lee Memorial is a monument commemorating Robert E. Lee, formerly installed in Roanoke, Virginia's Lee Plaza, in the United States. The monument's erection coincided with the run up to the centennial of the Civil War in 1961.

In June 2020, the Roanoke City Council voted to start the legal process to remove the monument and rename Lee Plaza after the July 1, 2020 date when a new state law removes the prohibition against removing monuments to the Confederate States of America. 

On just before midnight July 22, 2020, the monument was found to be torn down and broken into two pieces. A 70-year-old man named William Foreman, who was caught vandalizing the monument the night before it was torn down, was arrested on July 24, 2020, and agreed to cooperate with investigators.

See also

 List of Confederate monuments and memorials in Virginia
 List of memorials to Robert E. Lee

References

1960 establishments in Virginia
1960 sculptures
Buildings and structures in Roanoke, Virginia
Monuments and memorials in Virginia
Monuments and memorials to Robert E. Lee
Outdoor sculptures in Virginia
Stone sculptures in Virginia
Vandalized works of art in Virginia
Monuments and memorials in Virginia removed during the George Floyd protests